

Ranked by Length of National Highways 
This is a list of the States of India ranked by the length of the national highways, as of 23 May 2014. National Highways are the arterial roads of the country for inter-state movements of goods and passengers. They traverse the length and width of the country connecting the National and State capitals, major ports and rail junctions and link up with border roads and foreign highways

Ranked by Length of State Highways 
This is a list of the States of India ranked by the length of the state highways, as of 31 March 2012. State Highways are the arterial roads in a State for inter-district movements. They traverse the length and width of a state connecting the state capital, district headquarters and important towns and cities and link up with the National Highways and adjacent State Highways.

References 

India transport-related lists
Lists of subdivisions of India